A predictive dialer dials a list of telephone numbers and connects answered dials to people making calls, often referred to as agents. Predictive dialers use statistical algorithms to minimize the time that agents spend waiting between conversations, while minimizing the occurrence of someone answering when no agent is available.

When dialing numbers one at a time, there are two sources of delay. First, only some fraction of dials are answered; for example, if 1 out of 3 dials are answered, a predictive dialer might dial 3 lines every time an agent becomes available. Second, even dials that are answered take some time before being picked up. If it typically takes 10 seconds for someone to pick up, and conversations typically last 90 seconds, a predictive dialer might start dialing at 80 seconds.  A predictive dialer does so by discarding all tones and only passing "Hellos" from the lead to the agent.

Dialing one number at a time, only when an agent is available, typically keeps agents utilized for 40 minutes per hour (33% idle time). Predictive dialing can increase utilization to 57 minutes per hour (5% idle time).

Predictive dialers may be standalone hardware devices, cloud-based, or they may be integrated in software with call center or contact center platforms. A cloud-based predictive dialer provides the functionalities of a traditional predictive dialer without requiring installation on the local device and reduces the dependency on the hardware. The dialer can often also perform less aggressive dialing modes such as, power, progressive, or preview dialing.

Call progress analysis
Call Progress Analysis (CPA), also called Call Progress Detection (CPD), is a generic term for signal processing algorithms that operate on audio during call setup. The goal of CPA is to determine the nature of the callee or the outcome of call setup to an external network (traditional or IP). Specifically, when a call or session is being established, the caller or initiator is interested in knowing if someone answered, if the line is busy, etc. When the caller is an automated application, such as an automated dialer or message broadcasting system, CPA algorithms are used to perform the classification automatically.

Modern CPA methods in combination with automated outbound dialing applications, ensure fast and accurate automated call classification, which automatically translate in better efficiency of agents and higher quality customer interactions.

Traditional Call Progress Analysis implementations rely on simple rule-based algorithms which provide sub-optimal accuracy of speed of processing, leading to significant inefficiencies in operations and issues in meeting compliance from new government regulations.

Using statistical models based on Neural Networks to represent the potential outcomes of an outbound call attempt, companies can meet and exceed these regulations. This approach identifies much better the call patterns that represent call progress events and provides CPA results with far superior accuracy, speed and flexibility compared to traditional approaches.

This article  analyses a live scenario of a Predictive dialing call centre and what the factors to take into account to achieve maximum productivity.

Regulations 
In the UK, Ofcom requires that predictive dialers abandon fewer than 3% of answered calls on a daily basis.  Ofcom also requires that if an agent is not available within 2 seconds the call is considered "abandoned" and an automated message is played.  The automated message must identify the company making the call, the purpose of the call, a free phone or basic rate phone number to call back on and must not contain any form of marketing. A phone call to the return number must not be treated by the company as an opportunity to market, but to be removed from the calling list. In the UK "abandoned" calls must not be called back within 72 hours unless there is a dedicated agent available. GDPR (General Data Protection Regulation) also requires that the purpose of any call be related to the reason for collecting data in the first place.

In the United States, if someone answers but no agent is available within 2 seconds of the person's greeting, Federal Communications Commission (FCC) regulations consider the call "abandoned" and require the dialer to play a recorded message. The FCC requires that predictive dialers abandon less than 3% of answered calls.

In 1991 the Telephone Consumer Protection Act prohibited the use of an “automatic telephone dialing system” to contact “any telephone number assigned to a mobile telephone service” without “express prior consent” from the party being called. Dialing “accidents” are not an effective legal defense and penalties run from $500 to $1,500 per violating call.

In Canada, the maximum abandon rate is 5%, and calls cannot be made to numbers registered with the National Do Not Call Registry, emergency or health care providers. However, not-for-profit organizations such as survey companies are exempt from the National Do Not Call Registry.

In India, an idea was mooted in 2003 to create a National Do Not Call Registry, and finally got implemented in 2014. Since then the government is taking various measures to curb the menace that includes termination of the violators telecom resources. As of now there is no regulation for telecallers to classify an abandoned call or allowed percentage as yet, but it will come sooner or later.

See also
 Telemarketing
 Do Not Call Registry
 Dialer
 Computer telephony integration
 Direct marketing
 Robocall

References

Telemarketing
Telephony